Milo Greene is an American indie pop band formed in Los Angeles.  The band started as a quintet but is currently a trio, with members Robbie Arnett, Graham Fink and Marlana Sheetz.

History

Self-titled debut album (2012–2015) 
Sheetz described their sound to Lauren Moraski of CBS News by explaining, "Originally when we started this band we wanted to create music that we could potentially see being placed in movies and TV." They released their self-titled debut album on July 17, 2012. On October 6, 2012, the group released a short film entitled Moddison as a companion to the album. Written by the band and directed by Chad Huff, the film consists of a series of individual music videos for every song on Milo Greene. It was filmed over a span of five days at a cabin on Shaver Lake in California.

Milo Greene is the name of a fictitious booking agent, a persona created by the band to help them get gigs in the early days of playing shows. The band decided to use the name of their fictitious booking agent for the group.

Control (2015–2018) 
On September 30, 2014, Milo Greene announced that their second album, Control, would be released on January 27, 2015. They described the new album's tone as a departure from the more folk-based sounds of their previous work, instead sounding more upbeat and percussive.

Adult Contemporary (2018–present) 
Milo Greene released third album titled Adult Contemporary on September 7, 2018. The lead single "Move" was released in May.

Members 

Current members
Robbie Arnett – vocals, various instruments
Marlana Sheetz – vocals, various instruments
Graham Fink – vocals, various instruments
Curtis Marrero – percussion

Past members
Andrew Heringer – vocals, guitar

Discography

Albums

Singles 
"1957" (2012) 
"On the Fence" (2015)
"Move" (2018)

Music videos

References

External links 

Folk rock groups from California
Indie pop groups from Los Angeles
Indie rock musical groups from California
Musical groups established in 2010
Musical quartets
Atlantic Records artists
Elektra Records artists
Nettwerk Records artists
2010 establishments in California